Temple is a city in Carroll and Haralson counties in the U.S. state of Georgia. The population was 4,228 at the 2010 census, up from 2,383 in 2000, a 77% increase.

History
The name "Temple" was adopted in 1883 when the railroad was extended to the settlement, after one Mr. Temple, a railroad official. The Georgia General Assembly incorporated Temple as a town in 1883.

Geography

Temple is located in northeastern Carroll County at  (33.735723, -85.027298). A very small portion of the city extends west into Haralson County. U.S. Route 78 passes just south of the center of town, leading east  to Villa Rica and west  to Bremen. Interstate 20 passes through the southernmost part of the town, with access from Exit 19, and leads east  to Atlanta and west  to Oxford, Alabama.

Demographics

2020 census

As of the 2020 United States Census, there were 5,089 people, 1,575 households, and 1,391 families residing in the city.

2000 census
As of the census of 2000, there were 2,383 people, 864 households, and 664 families residing in the city. The racial makeup of the city was 84.47% White, 13.72% African American, 0.25% Native American, 0.17% Asian, 0.04% Pacific Islander, 0.38% from other races, and 0.97% from two or more races. Hispanic or Latino of any race were 1.80% of the population.

There were 864 households, out of which 39.4% had children under the age of 18 living with them, 57.2% were married couples living together, 12.6% had a female householder with no husband present, and 23.1% were non-families. 19.0% of all households were made up of individuals, and 5.4% had someone living alone who was 65 years of age or older.  The average household size was 2.76 and the average family size was 3.11.

In the city, the population was spread out, with 28.5% under the age of 18, 10.5% from 18 to 24, 32.8% from 25 to 44, 19.8% from 45 to 64, and 8.4% who were 65 years of age or older.  The median age was 31 years. For every 100 females, there were 91.7 males.  For every 100 females age 18 and over, there were 96.9 males.

The median income for a household in the city was $39,063, and the median income for a family was $40,679. Males had a median income of $34,028 versus $22,963 for females. The per capita income for the city was $15,301.  About 5.5% of families and 8.3% of the population were below the poverty line, including 13.4% of those under age 18 and 14.0% of those age 65 or over.

References

External links
City of Temple official website

Cities in Georgia (U.S. state)
Cities in Carroll County, Georgia
Cities in Haralson County, Georgia